The 2013 NCAA Division III baseball tournament was played at the end of the 2013 NCAA Division III baseball season to determine the 38th national champion of college baseball at the NCAA Division III level. The tournament concluded with eight teams competing at Time Warner Cable Field at Fox Cities Stadium in Grand Chute, Wisconsin for the championship. Eight regional tournaments were held to determine the participants in the World Series. Regional tournaments were contested in double-elimination format, with four regions consisting of six teams, and four consisting of eight, for a total of 56 teams participating in the tournament.

Bids
The 56 competing teams were:

Regionals
Bold indicates winner.

New England Regional
Whitehouse Field-Harwich, MA (Host: Eastern College Athletic Conference)

South Regional
USA Stadium-Millington, TN (Host: Rhodes College)

West Regional
Tornado Field-Austin, TX (Host: Concordia University Texas)

New York Regional
Leo Pinckney Field at Falcon Park-Auburn, NY (Host: Ithaca College)

Mideast Regional
Art Nehf Field-Terre Haute, IN (Host: Rose-Hulman Institute of Technology)

Midwest Regional
Prucha Field at James B. Miller Stadium-Whitewater, WI (Host: University of Wisconsin-Whitewater)

Mid-Atlantic Regional
PNC Field-Moosic, PA (Host: Misericordia University)

Central Regional
Brunner Field in the Duane R. Swanson Stadium-Moline, IL (Host: Augustana College (Illinois))

World Series
Time Warner Cable Field at Fox Cities Stadium-Grand Chute, WI (Host: University of Wisconsin-Oshkosh/Lawrence University/Fox Cities Convention and Visitors Bureau)

References

NCAA Division III Baseball Tournament
2013 college baseball season